List Biological Laboratories, (List Labs) is a US biotechnology company producing bacterial toxins. Their products are involved in vaccine development, toxin research and infectious disease research worldwide.

History
List Labs was founded in 1978 by Linda Shoer, and is headquartered in Campbell, California.

Starting with cholera, the firm developed bacterial proteins for research. When the firm was founded, and for many years after, it was the only manufacturer and supplier for several bacterial exotoxins and lipopolysaccharides (LPS).

In 2015 the firm performed a technology transfer of botulinum toxin manufacturing process to Allergan (for the product now known as Botox). It  manufactured the first human grade lipopolysaccaride product for clinical trial use, commissioned by the NIH. It was one of the first companies worldwide to manufacture live microbiomes for clinical trial starting in 2012.

References

External links
Official site

Companies based in Campbell, California
Biotechnology companies of the United States
1978 establishments in California
Biotechnology companies established in 1978